Live at Hull 1970 is a live album by the English rock band The Who. Their performance at Hull City Hall on 15 February 1970 was recorded with the Pye Mobile Unit by Bob Pridden. In a few songs the bass guitar sound was either badly recorded or lost due to technical problems.  For these songs, the bass guitar track from the previous night's Live at Leeds performance was matched to the Hull performance, allowing the show to be presented in full.

Original setlist

Track listing 
All songs written and composed by Pete Townshend except where noted.

Personnel
The Who
Roger Daltrey - lead vocals, harmonica, tambourine
John Entwistle - bass guitar, vocals
Keith Moon - drums, percussion, vocals
Pete Townshend - lead guitar, vocals
Producer and recorded by: Bob Pridden
ProTools Engineer of bass guitar track from the previous night's Live at Leeds: Matt Hay

Design
Sleeve design by Richard Evans
Photography: Richard Evans and Chris McCourt

notes
2012 issue of the concert originally released in 2010 as part of the Live at Leeds (40th Anniversary Ultimate Collectors' Edition) box set.
Original recording produced by The Who at Hull City Hall on 15 February 1970. Recorded on the Pye Mobile.

References 

The Who live albums
2012 live albums
Geffen Records live albums